Dr. Suellen K. Reed born June 22, 1945, is a former American educational politician. She served as the State Superintendent of Indiana from January 11, 1993, to January 12, 2009. She also served as Assistant Superintendent of Rushville Community Schools from 1987 to 1981.

References

Links
http://votesmart.org/candidate/biography/1861/suellen-reed#.UpVPW5EqBFw

Educators from Indiana
American women educators
Indiana Republicans
People from Rushville, Indiana
1945 births
Living people
Superintendents of Public Instruction of Indiana
21st-century American women